Anna Weiler (died 6 March 1458, Strasbourg), was a German Waldensian preacher.  She was active in Strasbourg with the male preacher Friedrich Reiser. They were both arrested and investigated by the Inquisition and subjected to a several months long heresy trial, which included torture. They were both convicted of heresy and burned alive at the stake.

References

1458 deaths
People executed by Germany
15th-century executions
People executed for heresy
People executed by burning
Victims of the Inquisition
Waldensians